Thyranthrene albicincta is a moth of the family Sesiidae. It is known from Malawi.

References

Endemic fauna of Malawi
Sesiidae
Lepidoptera of Malawi
Moths of Sub-Saharan Africa
Moths described in 1919